There are 28 routes assigned to the "A" zone of the California Route Marker Program, which designates county routes in California. The "A" zone includes county highways in Lassen, Plumas, Shasta, Siskiyou, and Tehama counties.

A1

County Route A1, more commonly known as Route of the Olympic Torch, is a  county route in Lassen County, California.

County Route A1 runs from Route 36 near Susanville to Route 139 near Eagle Lake. It was originally named Eagle Lake Road.

Major junctions
This route still exists as a bypass from Susanville for north–south motorists, but it is no longer signed as such.

A2

County Route A2 or Susanville Road is a county route located in Lassen County, connecting SR 299 and SR 139.

Major junctions

A3

County Route A3 or Standish–Buntingville Road is a road in Lassen County connected to U.S. Route 395, and functions as a bypass for northbound traffic around Susanville. At its northern end it is signed for Reno (via US 395), and its southern end for Lakeview, also via US 395.

This route still serves as bypass for north–south 395 motorists, but is no longer signed as such.

Major junctions

A5

County Route A5 or Bowman Road is a road in Tehama County connecting State Route 36 in Rosewood and I-5 in Cottonwood

Major junctions

A6

County Route A6 or Long Road is a road in Tehama County connecting Manton Road in Dales to Forward Road in Manton. Along the way it has an intersection with SR 36.

Major junctions

A7

County Route A7 is a road in Tehama County connecting Live Oak Road and SR 36 in Red Bluff.

Major junctions

A8

County Route A8 is road in Tehama County connecting SR 99 in Los Molinos and SR 36 in Red Bluff. 

Major junctions

A9

County Route A9 is a road in Tehama County connecting Round Valley Road in Paskenta and SR 99 and Interstate 5 in Corning.

Major junctions

A10

It runs from Ski Village Drive in the town of Mount Shasta City to a dead end at the  level on  Mount Shasta.

The highway, completed in 1958 at a cost of $980,000 and designated in 1959, was originally built to provide access to the Mount Shasta Ski Bowl, which was destroyed by an avalanche in 1978. Today, the highway provides access to Mount Shasta for climbers, skiers, and anyone wanting access to the mountain.

In wintertime, the road is kept open only to the U.S.F.S outpost at the  level.

Major junctions

A11

County Route A11 or Gyle Road is a county route located in Tehama County and connecting Interstate 5 and CR A8 near Tehama.

Major junctions

A12

A12 begins in the west at its junction with Old 99 Highway, which was once US 99. Just a few dozen yards to the east, it intersects Interstate 5.

One mile east of the Interstate junction, it passes through the tiny village of Grenada, the only population center of any merit along the route.  further east is the burg Mayten, which consists only of a convenience store, a church, and an elementary school.

The route is heavily used by travellers and truckers southbound on Interstate 5 who wish to use US 97 northbound en route to Klamath Falls and points north. Hence, the local name "97 cutoff".

The western two-thirds of the route passes through agricultural areas, and is very reminiscent of two-lane farm roads in California's Central Valley. However, the eastern portion is very scenic, passing through an area with towering dark red crags and buttes to the north.

Major junctions

A13

County Route A13, also known as Walker Memorial Road, is a road in Plumas County connected to SR 36.

Major junctions

A14

County Route A14 or Graeagle Johnsville Road is a road in Plumas County connecting SR 89 and Johnsville.

Major junctions

A15

County Route A15 or Portola McLears Road is a road in Plumas County connecting SR 89 and SR 70 in Portola.  On its northern end, after passing through the Old Town commercial district of Portola, A15 passes the Western Pacific Railroad Museum. 

Major junctions

A16

County Route A16 or Platina Road is a county route located in Shasta County connecting SR 36 to SR 273 in Redding. Known locally as "Ditch Grade Road"; the final  section before the junction with SR 36 closely follows the contour of hillside as this route was previously used to bring water to the mine at Platina.

Major junctions

A17

County Route A17 is a county route in the U.S. State of California, located in Shasta County and Tehama County, connecting I-5 near Cottonwood and California State Route 44 near Inwood.

Major junctions

A18

County Route A18 or Lake Boulevard is a road in Shasta County on the State Scenic Highway System connecting SR 273 (as well as Interstate 5 and SR 299) in Redding and Shasta Dam.

Major junctions

A19

County Route A19 or McArthur Road is a county route in Shasta County connecting SR 299 to SR 89.

Major junctions

A20

County Route A20 or Glenburn Road is a county route located in Shasta County connecting SR 89 to CR A19.

Major junctions

A21

County Route A21 or Mooney Road connects California State Route 147 to California State Route 44 and intersects California State Route 36 along the way.

Major junctions

A22

County Route A22 or Arlington Road is a county route located in Plumas County connecting SR 89 in Crescent Mills to Taylorsville.

Major junctions

A23

County Road A23 connects SR 49/SR 89 near Sattley to SR 70 near Beckwourth passing through the Sierra Valley on its west side. In the northerly direction, County Road A23 begins at the junction of SR 49/SR 89 at Sattley, formerly known as Church's Corners, which is a census-designated place in Sierra County. The road leaves Sattley as Westside Road. It passes near Calpine, a census-designated place in Sierra County where the road becomes Beckwourth-Calpine Road and continues to SR 70 near Beckwourth, a census-designated place in Plumas County.

Major junctions

A24

County Route A24 or Dyson Lane is a county route located in Plumas and Sierra County connecting SR 49 in Loyalton to SR 70 in Hawley.

Major junctions

A25

County Route A25 or Herlong Access Road is a short highway, paired with CR A26, that services Herlong and the Sierra Army Depot.

Major junctions

A26

County Route A26 or Garnier Road is a short highway, paired with CR A25, that services Herlong and the Sierra Army Depot.

Major junctions

A27

County Route A27 or Center Road is a county route that goes from SR 36 in Susanville to US 395 in Litchfield, passing by the High Desert State Prison.

Major junctions

A28

County Route A28 is a two-lane rural highway. A28 begins at CR A12 in Grenada, connecting Grenada with I-5 near Hornbrook via Montague. It is a flat, level route, and for this reason, was the original preferred routing for both US 99 and I-5 through the area. In both instances, the routing was changed because of intense lobbying by officials in Yreka, who decried the fact that the major highway through the county would bypass the county seat. Thus, both highways ended up being built over far more rigorous terrain at a huge cost increase.

A28 serves the aforementioned three towns, as well as numerous homes and ranches along the way.

Major junctions

A29

County Route A29 or Big Springs Road is a county route that goes from the 99-97 Cutoff to US 97, passing through the census-designated place of Lake Shastina and unincorporated community of Big Springs.

Major junctions

See also

References

A*